Rune Temte (born 29 September 1965) is a Norwegian actor best known for his roles in The Last Kingdom and Eddie the Eagle. He portrayed Bron-Char in the Marvel Studios superhero film Captain Marvel in 2019.

Early life and sporting career 
Born and raised in Solbergelva on the outskirts of Oslo, Temte began playing football aged 7, achieving his first professional contract aged 18. Temte played for Strømsgodset Football Club, playing for the team across five seasons and was awarded player of the year in 1988.

After five years with Strømsgodset Football Club, Temte took the decision to quit the sport to pursue his first love of acting. Temte trained at the Drama Studio London, in 1993–1994. He continued to play football throughout his training for Tooting and Mitcham United F.C.

Temte was also active in the sport of bandy, playing for the club Solberg SK and the under-19 Norway national bandy team. In the 1984 Bandy World Championship Y-19 in Vänersborg, Sweden, Temte played as a midfielder when the Norwegian team won the bronze medal.

Acting career 

Temte founded his own production company, Temte Productions, in 1991 and has produced more than 20 theatre productions, one feature film, and three short films. He is also a stage actor.

Personal life 

Temte is fluent in English, Swedish and Norwegian. He is married to fashion designer Thea Glimsdal Temte, and they have one son. He tweeted his support for his favourite team Leeds United on Twitter following the teams's promotion to the Premier League on 20 July 2020

Credits

Television

Film

Norwegian Dubbing

Film

References

External links

Temte Productions
Rune Temte at BFI

1965 births
Living people
People from Nedre Eiker
Norwegian bandy players
Strømsgodset Toppfotball players
Alumni of the Drama Studio London
Norwegian expatriates in the United Kingdom
Norwegian male stage actors
Norwegian male film actors
Norwegian male television actors
Norwegian male soap opera actors
Association footballers not categorized by position
Norwegian footballers
20th-century Norwegian people
21st-century Norwegian people